Finisterre is the sixth studio album by English alternative dance band Saint Etienne, released on 7 October 2002 by Mantra Records. A double-disc deluxe edition was released on 3 May 2010 by Heavenly Records.

Background
Following two relatively uniform albums, Good Humor and Sound of Water, Finisterre contains a wide mixture of sounds and styles (as would its successor Tales from Turnpike House). The album returned to the inclusion of vocal interludes between songs as last heard on their album So Tough and a more angular, electronic sound, particularly on tracks such as "Action", "Shower Scene" and "New Thing". "Language Lab" and "Summerisle" recall the ambient style of Sound of Water, while "Stop and Think It Over" would not have been out of place on Good Humor or its predecessor, Tiger Bay.

The vocal interludes were supplied by Michael Jayston's narration as featured in the film released to accompany the album, also called Finisterre. The film was directed by Paul Kelly and Kieran Evans and was born out of visuals used to accompany certain tracks from the album shown during their live shows. The film debuted at a sold-out show in October 2002 at the Royal Festival Hall on London's Southbank, and was re-released to select screens in 2005. It is currently available on DVD. The album sleeve features a photograph of the East London tower block Ronan Point shortly after it collapsed in 1968 with the loss of four lives.

Nitsuh Abebe of Pitchfork Media scored the album 7.6 out of ten and wrote that "[t]he big comeback on Finisterres part is that they're tugging those strings again, confidently", citing "B92" as a highlight. However, Abebe criticised "Action" and "New Thing" as "just begging for the bigger kick drums that would turn them into flat-out stompers."

Track listing

Previously unreleased tracks are "So Mystified", "White Dress", "Stop and Think It Over" (Kid Loco Mix). "There There My Brigadier" was never released commercially, but given away on a promotional single at a Doctor Who convention in 2003 for a later-abandoned album of Dr Who-related remixes.

B-sides
 from "Action"
 "Anderson Unbound"
 "7 Summers"
 "Action" (Mr Joshua Edit)
 "Action" (DJ Tiësto Remix)
 "Action" (Laub Remix)

 from "Soft Like Me" / "Shower Scene"
 "Gimp Crisis"
 "Time and Tide"
 "Shock Corridor"
 "Soft Like Me" (Mr Joshua Mix)
 "Abby I Hardly Knew You"
 "Soft Like Me" (K.O.W. Radiophonic Rework)
 "New Thing"

Charts

References

2002 albums
Saint Etienne (band) albums